James A. Anderson may refer to:

James Allan Anderson (chess player) (1906–1991), American chess player
James Arthur Anderson (born 1955), American writer
James A. Anderson (academic administrator), chancellor of Fayetteville State University
James A. Anderson (cognitive scientist) (born 1940), American professor of cognitive science and brain science

See also
James A. D. W. Anderson (born 1958), British computer scientist
James A. Andersen (1924–2022), American politician and judge in the state of Washington